This is a list of fictional characters in the television series The Riches. The article deals with the series' main, recurring, and minor characters.

Malloy/"Rich" Family

Travellers

Edenfalls 

A gated community in Ducaine, it's mentioned that the houses of Edenfalls cost upwards of two million dollars. The Edenfalls homeowners association is headed by Hartley Underwood.

Panco  

A highly unethical real estate firm where Wayne Malloy bluffs his way into a job as legal counsel.

The Rosemere Academy

The Riches

References

Riches, The
Riches, The